Laurel Municipal Airport  is two miles north of Laurel, in Yellowstone County, Montana, and  southwest of Billings, Montana, United States. The National Plan of Integrated Airport Systems for 2011–2015 categorized it as a general aviation facility. It sees no airlines.

Facilities
It has three runways: 4/22 is  asphalt; 14/32 is  asphalt; 9/27 is  turf.

In the year ending September 15, 2010 the airport had 41,900 general aviation aircraft operations, average 114 per day. 89 aircraft were then based at the airport: 84% single-engine, 6% multi-engine, 7% helicopter, and 3% ultralight.

Northern Skies Aviation is the only fixed-base operator.

References

External links 
 Northern Skies Aviation, the fixed-base operator (FBO)
 Aerial image as of August 1996 from USGS The National Map
 
 

Airports in Montana
Buildings and structures in Yellowstone County, Montana
Transportation in Yellowstone County, Montana